Lenovo Skylight was a small portable computer with mobile data capabilities (sometimes called a smartbook) designed by Lenovo. The project was announced in January 2010, but was cancelled less than six months later.

History
Qualcomm was rumored to announce a smartbook at an analyst meeting on November 12, 2009.
A Lenovo device concept was shown, and reported that it would be announced officially at the Consumer Electronics Show of January 2010. The Lenovo device was expected to be sold through AT&T carrier in the US.
A Lenovo device was submitted to the FCC earlier in October, rumored to be the smartbook in question. In early January 2010, it was announced that the Lenovo smartbook's name would be "Skylight" and more detailed specifications were made public.

Some of the design differences from a traditional notebook included a semicircular shape, relatively larger touchpad, and Universal Serial Bus connector which extends out from the keyboard surface.
The Skylight used the Snapdragon technology from Qualcomm with a custom Linux operating system.

In May 2010 the product was cancelled.

References

External links
 

Linux-based devices
Skylight
Smartbooks